The FIBA Africa Championship 1972, was the sixth FIBA Africa Championship regional basketball championship held by FIBA Africa, which also served as Africa qualifier for the 1972 Summer Olympics, granting berths to the champion and runner-up. It was held in Senegal between 25 December 1971 and 2 January 1972. Twelve national teams entered the event under the auspices of FIBA Africa, the sport's regional governing body. The city of Dakar hosted the tournament. Senegal won their second title after defeating Egypt in the final.

Format
Teams were split into two round-robin groups of six teams each. The top two teams from each group advanced to the knockout semi-finals. The winners in the semi-finals competed for the championship and were granted berths to the 1968 Summer Olympics, while the losing teams from the semifinals competed for third place in an extra game. 
To define the remaining places in the final standings, teams that did not reach the semifinals played an extra game each against the team from the other group that finished in the same place in the preliminary stage. For example, third-placed teams from groups A and B played an extra game to define fifth and sixth places in the final standings.

First round

Group A

|}

Group B

|}

Knockout stage

Championship bracket

Semifinals

Third place

Final

Classification stage

Fifth place

Seventh place

Ninth place

Eleventh place

Final standings

External links
 1972 African Championship for Men, FIBA.com.

B
1972 in African basketball
AfroBasket
International basketball competitions hosted by Senegal
December 1971 sports events in Africa
January 1972 sports events in Africa